is a Japanese voice actress and singer. She is affiliated with the talent agency HoriPro International and signed to record label Lantis. She participated in an audition sponsored by this agency. Her notable roles include Aoi Kiriya in Aikatsu!, Shizuka Mogami in The Idolmaster Million Live!, Kaoru Seta in BanG Dream!,  Phino Bloodstone in Yu-Shibu, Chtholly Nota Seniorious in WorldEnd and Moroha in Yashahime: Princess Half-Demon. She performed theme songs for anime, such as Myriad Colors Phantom World and Trickster.

Biography
Tadokoro was born in Mito, Ibaraki. She became interested in acting after hearing Akiko Yajima voicing Kohaku in the anime series Inuyasha. She participated in the 36th Horipro Talent Scout Caravan and was declared the winner. She joined the talent agency Horipro and decided to debut as a singer with the record label Lantis. She made her voice acting debut in 2012, voicing a character in a commercial for SSK Foods. That same year she was cast as Muneo Meshiyori in So, I Can't Play H!. Later that year, she was cast as Aoi Kiriya in Aikatsu! becoming her first main role. Since then, she has appeared in many concerts, stage events and radio programs. The following year she was cast as Phino Bloodstone in I Couldn't Become a Hero, So I Reluctantly Decided to Get a Job., and Shizuka Mogami in the mobile game The Idolmaster Million Live!. In 2014, she was cast as Kotori Takatori in Brynhildr in the Darkness. She performed the series' ending theme song  with Risa Taneda, Aya Suzaki, and M·A·O. Late that year, she made her official debut as a singer for Lantis by releasing her first album Beyond Myself; the album peaked at number 33 on the Oricon weekly charts.

She launched her official Facebook and Twitter account on May 31, 2015. In April 2015, she released her first single "DREAM LINE"; the song peaked at number 40 on the Oricon weekly charts. That same year, she was cast as Kiriko Shikishima in Ultimate Otaku Teacher. The following year, she voiced the character Ruru in Myriad Colors Phantom World; she performed the series' ending theme song . Later that year, she played the character Nao Nakamura in the anime Trickster; she performed the series' first opening theme song "1HOPE SNIPER", and the second ending theme song .

In 2017, she voiced Tae Futaba in Masamune-kun's Revenge. She then played the role of Chtholly Nota Seniorious in the anime WorldEnd which she also performed the opening theme song "DEAREST DROP". The following year, she was cast as Symboli Rudolf in Cygames's multimedia franchise Uma Musume Pretty Derby, and Chloe in That Time I Got Reincarnated as a Slime; she performed the series' second ending theme song . Tadokoro released the song "RIVALS" as the ending theme for the anime series Kandagawa Jet Girls.

Filmography

Anime series

Anime films

Video games

Dubbing
All of Us Are Dead, Park Mi-jin (Lee Eun-saem)
Detention, Fang Ray-shin (Gingle Wang)
The Gilded Age, Gladys Russell (Taissa Farmiga)
Palm Springs, Tala Anne Wilder (Camila Mendes)
Vanguard, Fareeda (Xu Ruohan)

Others
There's No Way I Can Have A Lover! (*Or Maybe There Is?!), Mai Oozuka (promotional video)
Hoshimachi Suisei Tadokoro Azusa Heikousen Scramble weekly podcast with Hololive talent Hoshimachi Suisei

Discography

Albums

Singles

References

External links
  
  
  
 
 Azusa Tadokoro at Lantis 

1993 births
Living people
Anime singers
Horipro artists
Japanese video game actresses
Japanese voice actresses
Lantis (company) artists
Musicians from Ibaraki Prefecture
Voice actresses from Ibaraki Prefecture
21st-century Japanese actresses
21st-century Japanese singers
21st-century Japanese women singers